Whick is an unincorporated community and coal town in Breathitt County, Kentucky, United States. Its post office closed in 2004.

References

Unincorporated communities in Breathitt County, Kentucky
Unincorporated communities in Kentucky
Coal towns in Kentucky